This is a list of bridges and overpasses whose low clearance or structure gauge causes a notable amount of accidents, also known as bridge strikes. Simply being struck by a vehicle is not criteria for inclusion on this list. To be included, bridge should have a notable history of strikes.

Many countries establish minimum standards for the structure gauge of bridges. For example, the United States requires a height of 14 feet for highway bridges. Some vehicle standards are made to conform to these expectations. In much of the United States, the maximum height of a semi truck is 13 feet, 6 inches. Some bridges were built before the adoption of these standards, and are undersized. Accidents involving these bridges have spurred mitigation efforts, such as installing sensors and signs that warn drivers. These efforts do not entirely eliminate strikes, prompting some efforts to increase the clearance height.

Viral videos of bridge strikes have generated substantial public interest. One of the most famous examples of this is the Norfolk Southern–Gregson Street Overpass, also known as the "11foot8" bridge, which was popularized by a YouTube channel.

Bridges 

The bridges are listed in ascending order of height.

References 

Strikes
Road hazards